The grand prix RTL-Lire is one of the main literary awards of the winter/spring literary season in France. Given in partnership with Lire magazine, it rewards a French-language novel chosen by a jury of readers.

History 
In 1992, the grand prix RTL-Lire took over the "prix RTL grand public" created in 1975. A long-list of ten authors followed by a short-list of five is selected in January by the editors of the RTL radio station and the magazine Lire.

The award-winning book benefits from a promotional campaign and extensive editorial coverage on RTL radio and in the magazine Lire

List of laureates of the Grand prix RTL-Lire

External links 
 Grand Prix RTL - "Lire" on the site of the Académie française
 Grand Prix RTL - "Lire" on Babelio
  Grand Prix RTL-Lire  on Prix Littéraire.net
 5 articles « Grand Prix rtl lire » on LivresHebdo
 Découvrez les 5 finalistes du Grand Prix RTL-Lire 2017 on RTL

RTL-Lire, Grand Prix
Radio awards